Pierre-François Beauvallet (13 October 1801 – 21 December 1873) was a 19th-century French actor and playwright.

Biography 
Beauvallet first made his reputation as a melodrama actor, then became an ordinary tragedian of the Comédie-Française; He tried with less success to be a playwright. His son was the writer and dramatist Léon Beauvallet.

He was a professor at the Conservatoire de Paris from 1839 to 1872.

Theatre

Career at the Comédie-Française 
 Entrance in 1830
 Appointed 251th sociétaire in 1832
 Departure in 1861

Bibliography 
 Pierre Larousse, « Léon Beauvallet », Grand dictionnaire universel du XIXe siècle, tome 2, Paris, 1867, at Gallica

External links 
 Base documentaire La Grange sur le site de la Comédie-Française

19th-century French male actors
French male stage actors
Sociétaires of the Comédie-Française
19th-century French dramatists and playwrights
People from Pithiviers
1801 births
1873 deaths